Song Yang (born 12 May 1965) is an Australian badminton player, born in Nanjing, China. She competed in women's singles at the 1996 Summer Olympics in Atlanta.

References

External links

1965 births
Living people
Sportspeople from Nanjing
Australian female badminton players
Olympic badminton players of Australia
Badminton players at the 1996 Summer Olympics
Chinese emigrants to Australia
Commonwealth Games medallists in badminton
Commonwealth Games bronze medallists for Australia
Badminton players at the 1994 Commonwealth Games
Medallists at the 1994 Commonwealth Games